Claudine Hermann (19 December 1945 – 17 July 2021) was a French physicist and Honorary Professor at École Polytechnique. She was the first woman to be appointed professor at École Polytechnique in 1992. She was also the Vice President of the European Platform of Women Scientists.

Early life and education 
Hermann was the daughter of a pharmacist. She studied at the École normale supérieure de jeunes filles and graduated in 1965. She completed her doctoral studies at Paris Diderot University, with a thesis that considered gallium antimonide. She was appointed a lecturer at École Polytechnique in 1980. She taught classes in semiconductor physics.

Research and career 
Hermann was the first woman to be appointed Professor at École Polytechnique in 1992. She worked on the optical properties of solids, in particular the photo-emission of polarised electrons. She developed techniques to optically measure the spin resonance in semiconductors. She spent a year as a visiting researcher at Nagoya University in 1998. She demonstrated the hole effective mass (0.051) of Indium gallium arsenide.

She obtained the value of the Landé g-factor g=-0.44 for electrons in Gallium Arsenide which is important for spin physics in the quantum Hall regime.

Advocacy for women in physics 
Alongside her research into condensed matter, Hermann worked to make the environment better for women physicists. In 1999 she was appointed to the European Union Helsinki Group on women and science, and remained a member until 2006. She co-founded the platform Femme & Sciences with Huguette Delavault in 2000. She was a member of the expert group who produced the ETAN report on women in academia for the European Union in 2000. Hermann was also the President of Honour of the European Platform of Women Scientists.

Books 
 2010 Statistical Physics: Including Applications to Condensed Matter
 2003 Physics of Semiconductors

Awards 
 2015 Grand Officer Legion of Honour
 2010 National Order of Merit

References 

1945 births
Living people
French women physicists
French women scientists
École Polytechnique alumni
French physicists